Rašid Avdić (Serbian Cyrillic: Рашид Авдић; born 14 August 1980) is a Serbian-born Bosnian-Herzegovinian retired football forward who finished his career at the First League of Republika Srpska club FK Podrinje Janja.

Club career
He started his career in Serbian clubs FK Mladost Apatin, FK Radnički Klupci and FK Loznica. In 2004, he went to Bosnia where he played for FK Radnik Bijeljina, HŠK Zrinjski Mostar and Sarajevo based famous FK Željezničar. After a brief spell in Serbian First League, second Serbian tier, club FK Mačva Šabac he played for the Macedonian Prva Liga historically greatest FK Vardar. In 2009, he signed for Bosnian club NK Zvijezda Gradačac.

References

External links
 Profile and stats at Srbijafudbal
 Profile at Playerhistory
 
 2010-11 stats at BiHsoccer

1980 births
Living people
Sportspeople from Loznica
Bosniaks of Serbia
Association football forwards
Bosnia and Herzegovina footballers
FK Mladost Apatin players
FK Radnički Klupci players
FK Loznica players
FK Radnik Bijeljina players
HŠK Zrinjski Mostar players
FK Željezničar Sarajevo players
FK Mačva Šabac players
FK Vardar players
NK Zvijezda Gradačac players
FK Podrinje Janja players
First League of Serbia and Montenegro players
Premier League of Bosnia and Herzegovina players
Serbian First League players
First League of the Republika Srpska players
Bosnia and Herzegovina expatriate footballers
Expatriate footballers in North Macedonia